Coveney may refer to:
Hugh Coveney (1935–1998), Irish politician
John Coveney, Australian rugby league footballer
Michael Coveney (born 1948), British theatre critic
Patrick Coveney (1934-2022), Irish Roman Catholic prelate, papal nuncio to Greece
Peter Coveney, physical chemist and science writer
Simon Coveney (born 1972), Irish politician
Coveney, Cambridgeshire, a village in Cambridgeshire, England, United Kingdom